Thomas Richard (11 February 1783 – 3 January 1856) was a Calvinistic Methodist minister.

Personal life 
Thomas was born to Henry and Hannah Richard in Trefin, Pembrokeshire. His brother, Ebenezer Richard, was also a Methodist preacher. He married Bridget Gwyn of Maenorowen in 1819, niece to the second wife of David Jones of Llan-gan, also a famous Methodist. Richard pursued a farming life after marriage before retiring to Fishguard in 1825 until his death. He is buried at Maenorowen.

Religious life 
As a youth, Thomas Richard joined the religious society at Tre-fin. He began preaching in 1803 and developed a reputation across Wales for his powerful sermons. In 1814, he was ordained at the Association in Llangeitho. His sermons were published by Edward Matthews 1866-7.

References

Further reading 
 Y Drysorfa, 1856, 68;
 E. Matthews, Bywgraffiad y Parch. Thos. Richard, Abergwaen nodiadau arno fel dyn, Cristion, a phregethwr, Swansea, 1863

Calvinistic Methodists
19th-century Welsh Methodist ministers
People from Pembrokeshire
1783 births
1856 deaths